Impressions of Copenhagen is an album by pianist Joseph Bonner recorded in 1981 and released on the Theresa label.

Reception

In his review for AllMusic, Scott Yanow observed "Bonner is an underrated talent, and this is one of his finest recordings".

Track listing
All compositions by Joseph Bonner except as indicated
 "Impressions of Copenhagen/R.V." - 6:43    
 "The North Star" - 6:15    
 "I'll Say No This Time" - 6:42    
 "Quiet Dawn"" (Cal Massey) - 10:43    
 "Why Am I Here?" - 7:57    
 "Lush Life" (Billy Strayhorn) - 5:35 Bonus track on CD reissue

Personnel
Joe Bonner - piano, chimes
Eddie Shu - trumpet
Holly Hofmann - flute
Carol Michalowski, Peggy Sullivan - violin
Carol Garrett - viola
Beverly Woolery - cello
Paul Warburton - bass
J. Thomas Tilton - drums

References

1981 albums
Joe Bonner albums
Theresa Records albums